This is a list of universities in Serbia.

There are nine public universities in Serbia and ten private universities. Apart from universities and faculties, there are also public and private colleges.

As of 2020–21 school year, there are 243,730 enrolled students at universities in Serbia, of whom 205,058 (85.3%) study at public universities and 30,221 (14.7%) at private universities. Also, there are 38,672 enrolled students at independent faculties and public and private colleges in Serbia.

Public

List of public universities and faculties that are funded through a budget of the Government of Serbia (excluding universities in Kosovo). Also, there is data about number of enrolled students as of 2021–22 school year.

Private

List of private universities in Serbia (excluding universities in Kosovo), with data about number of enrolled students as of 2021–22 school year.

See also
 List of universities in Kosovo
 Education in Serbia

Notes and references
Notes

References

External links

 
Universities
Serbia
Serbia